Roland Bautista (May 30, 1951 – February 29, 2012) was an American singer, songwriter and guitarist. Bautista was best known for his work with Earth, Wind & Fire. He also worked with such artists as Ronnie Laws, The Crusaders, George Duke and Randy Crawford.

Career

Earth, Wind and Fire
Bautista first played as a rhythm guitarist on Earth, Wind & Fire's 1972 album Last Days and Time. He left the band soon after the album's release, but returned in 1981 to replace departed guitarist Al McKay. Bautista played on the Earth, Wind & Fire albums Raise!, Powerlight and Electric Universe from 1981 to 1983. The band then took a four-year hiatus, and Bautista did not return when they reformed in 1987.

Work with other artists
During 1967, Roland Bautista joined the Velvet Illusions, a teen band originally from Yakima, Washington, in Hollywood, California, playing guitar in live shows and on at least one recording, which was made at Sunset Sound, entitled, "Lazy". The Velvet Illusions' 45 RPM records are sought-after on the collectors' market. The band broke up in early fall, 1967. But nearly fifty years later, in 2019, their material was reissued on CD and LP.

As a rhythm guitarist Bautista later played on Ronnie Laws's 1975 debut LP Pressure Sensitive, Leon Haywood's 1975 album Come and Get Yourself Some and The Crusaders 1976 LP Free as the Wind. Bautista then issued two solo albums being 1977's Bautista and 1978's The Heat of the Wind on ABC Records. As well he played on Ronnie Laws 1977 album Friends & Strangers. Friends & Strangers has been certified Gold in the US by the RIAA. Bautista then performed upon B.B. King's 1978 album Midnight Believer and Tom Waits' 1978 release Blue Valentine. He also featured on The Crusaders' 1978 Grammy nominated album Images, George Duke's 1978 LP Don't Let Go and The Jacksons 1978 album Destiny. Destiny has been certified Platinum in the US by the RIAA. Bautista later played upon George Duke's 1979 LP Follow the Rainbow, Dee Dee Bridgewater's 1979 album Bad for Me and The Crusaders' 1979 LP Street Life. Street Life has been certified Gold in the US by the RIAA.

Bautista once again played with Tom Waits on his 1980 album Heartattack and Vine. He also featured on Randy Crawford's 1980 LP Now You May Begin. Now You May Begin has been certified Silver in the UK by the BPI.
 As well Bautista made guest appearances on Ramsey Lewis's 1980 LP Routes, The Dramatics 1980 album 10 1/2 and George Duke's 1980 LP A Brazilian Love Affair. He also featured on Stanley Turrentine's 1981 album Tender Togetherness, the Yellowjackets 1981 self titled debut LP and Ella Fitzgerald's 1981 album Ella Abraça Jobim.

Bautista went on to play rhythm guitar on Ronnie Laws' 1983 album Mr. Nice Guy, Phillip Bailey's 1983 LP Continuation, Jennifer Holliday's Grammy nominated 1983 album Feel My Soul. He also appeared on Laws' 1984 album Classic Masters, The Crusaders' 1984 Grammy nominated LP Ghetto Blaster and Morris Day's 1985 album Color of Success. Color of Success has been certified Gold in the US by the RIAA. He again collaborated with Ramsey Lewis on his 1987 album Keys to the City. On Keys to the City he played alongside his former EWF bandmates Maurice White, Larry Dunn and Don Myrick. Bautista later guested on Ronnie Laws' 1989 LP True Spirit and The Crusaders 1993 album Live in Japan.

Personal life
On February 29, 2012, Roland Bautista died. He was 60 years old.

Legacy
Artists such as Brandon Williams and William DuVall of Alice in Chains have been influenced by Bautista.

Selective discography
1972 Last Days and Time – Earth, Wind & Fire
1975 Pressure Sensitive – Ronnie Laws
1975 Come and Get Yourself Some - Leon Haywood
1976 Free as the Wind – The Crusaders
1977 Bautista – Roland Bautista
1977 Friends & Strangers – Ronnie Laws
1977 Genie – Bobby Lyle
1977 New Warrior – Bobby Lyle
1977 Peddlin' Music on the Side – Lamont Dozier
1978 Blue Valentine – Tom Waits
1978 Destiny – The Jacksons
1978 Flame – Ronnie Laws
1978 Don't Let Go – George Duke
1978 Images – The Crusaders
1978 Heat of the Wind – Roland Bautista
1978 Midnight Believer – B.B. King
1979 Street Life – The Crusaders
1979 Master of the Game – George Duke
1980 Seawind – Seawind
1980 A Brazilian Love Affair – George Duke
1980 Heartattack and Vine – Tom Waits
1980 10½ – The Dramatics 
1980 Now We May Begin – Randy Crawford
1980 Rhapsody and Blues – The Crusaders
1980 Routes – Ramsey Lewis
1980 Tender Togetherness – Stanley Turrentine
1981 Electric Collection – Ramsey Lewis
1981 Solid Ground – Ronnie Laws
1981 Raise! – Earth, Wind & Fi
1983 Powerlight – Earth, Wind & Fire
1983 Mr. Nice Guy - Ronnie Laws
1983 Continuation - Phillip Bailey
1983 Feel My Soul - Jennifer Holliday
1983 Electric Universe – Earth, Wind & Fire
1984 Classic Masters – Ronnie Laws
1984 Ghetto Blaster - The Crusaders
1985 Color of Success – Morris Day
1987 Keys to the City – Ramsey Lewis
1989 True Spirit - Ronnie Laws
1993 Live in Japan'' – The Crusaders

References

1951 births
2012 deaths
Rhythm guitarists
American funk guitarists
American session musicians
Earth, Wind & Fire members
American rhythm and blues guitarists
American soul guitarists
American male guitarists
20th-century American guitarists
People from Hemet, California